Richard Brown (born 28 August 1984) is an Australian rugby union footballer.

Career
He is one of six players to have represented the Western Force in all of its Super 14 games in 2007, and one of 14 Force players selected in the Wallabies train-on squad in May 2008. In 2009 Brown became the Wallabies first choice number 8. In 2000 he played in the first XV at St. Josephs Nudgee College in Brisbane, captained by Rocky Elsom. Brown was in Year 11 with Hugh McMeniman and Rocky Elsom was in Year 12.

In 2002, Brown played in the University of Queensland Undefeated Colts 1 Premiership team. This team also included other future professional players such as Stephen Moore, Heath Tessman, Hugh McMeniman, Mitchell Chapman, Tim Usasz, Josh Graham and Drew Mitchell.

References

External links 
Wallabies Player Profile
Western Force Profile
itsrugby.co.uk Profile

Australian rugby union players
Australia international rugby union players
Western Force players
Sportsmen from Queensland
Rugby union flankers
Living people
1984 births
Mie Honda Heat players
Australian expatriate rugby union players
Expatriate rugby union players in Japan
Australian expatriate sportspeople in Japan
Rugby union players from Queensland